Ata Bin Khalil Abu al-Rashtah (born 1943) is an Islamic jurist, scholar and writer. He is the global leader of the Islamic political party Hizb ut-Tahrir. He came to prominence in Jordan during the 1991 Persian Gulf War and was a critic of Iraq's invasion of Kuwait.

Biography
Ata Abu Rashta (Sheikh Abu Yasin Ata bin Khalil bin Ahmad bin Abdul Qadir al-Khatib Abu Rashta) was born into an observant Islamic family in the village of Ra'na in Mandate Palestine. His family was expelled from Ra'na in 1948 and moved to a refugee camp near Hebron, where he completed elementary and middle school.

He graduated from the Al Hussein Bin Ali school in Hebron in 1960 and completed his matriculation at the Ibrahimiya school in Jerusalem in 1961. Accepted to the Faculty of Engineering at Cairo University in Egypt, he graduated with a degree in civil engineering in 1966. He worked in a number of Arab countries as a civil engineer and wrote a book on the calculation of quantities in relation to the construction of buildings and roads.

Politics
Rashta joined Hizb ut-Tahrir in the mid-1950s and worked closely with Taqiuddin an-Nabhani, founder of the party, and Abdul Qadeem Zallum who succeeded him after an-Nabhani's death in 1977. In the 1980s, Abu Rashta he was a leading member of Hizb ut-Tahrir in Jordan and was appointed its first official spokesperson.

Abu Rashta came to prominence in Jordan during the Persian Gulf War when he convened press conferences, lectures and debates at public venues throughout the country. He debated the Iraqi invasion of Kuwait at the Jerusalem Mosque in Amman at which he delivered a lecture entitled The Neo-Crusader Assault on the Arabian Peninsula and the Gulf. He was regularly detained by the Jordanian authorities.

In a 1994 interview, Ata Abu Rashta said:"The establishment of the Caliphate is now a general demand among Muslims, who yearn for this: the call for Islamic government (the Caliphate) is widespread in Egypt, Syria, Turkey, Pakistan, Algeria and so on. Before Hizb al-Tahrir launched its career, the subject of the Caliphate was unheard of. However, the party has succeeded in establishing its intellectual leadership, and now everyone has confidence in its ideas, and talks about it: this is clear from the media worldwide." Rashta was sentenced to three years in prison for an interview published in 1995 in the journal al-Hiwar. He was later imprisoned for another six months for being a member of an "unlicensed organisation."

Rashta became the global leader of Hizb ut-Tahrir on 13 April 2003, following the death of Abdul Qadeem Zallum. Since assuming this position, Rashta launched his own website and has spoken at conferences in Indonesia, Pakistan, Yemen and the UK.

Published works
 Tayseer fi usool at-tafseer surah al-baqarah (2007)
 Economic crises - the reality and the perspective of Islam
 Tayseer al Wusool min al-Usool

References

External links

1943 births
Living people
Amnesty International prisoners of conscience held by Jordan
Cairo University alumni
Members of Hizb ut-Tahrir
Palestinian Islamists
Palestinian prisoners and detainees
Palestinian civil engineers